Gwendolen is a feminine given name, in general use only since the 19th century.

It has come to be the standard English form of Latin Guendoloena, which was first used by Geoffrey of Monmouth as the name of a legendary British queen in his History of the Kings of Britain. He reused the name in his Life of Merlin (c. 1150) for a different character, the wife of the titular magician "Merlinus", a counsellor to King Arthur; the metre shows that Geoffrey pronounced it as a pentasyllable, Guĕndŏlŏēnă, with the "gu" pronounced . Dr. Arthur Hutson suggests that "Guendoloena" arose from a misreading of the old Welsh masculine name Guendoleu; Geoffrey may have mistaken the final U for an N, then Latinized *Guendolen as a feminine name to arrive at Guendoloena. In the Vita Merlini, however, Geoffrey Latinizes the masculine name of Gwenddoleu ap Ceidio as Guennolous.
Spelled Gwendoloena, the name reoccurs in the anonymous Latin romance De Ortu Waluuanii belonging to Arthur's queen Guinevere.

It did not become a common English given name until the 19th century. Gwendoline was in use in England by the 1860s (an early example being Lady Gwendoline Anson, born c. 1837, a daughter of the 1st Earl of Lichfield), and Gwendolen appeared in Daniel Deronda, written by George Eliot and published in serialized form 1874–6.

Notable bearers

People
Gwendolen Margaret Carter (1906–1991), Canadian scholar of African affairs
Gwendolen Mary "Gwen" John (1876–1939), Welsh painter
Gwendolen Fer (born 1986), french Equestrian rider
Gwendolen Fitzalan-Howard, Duchess of Norfolk (1877–1945), British duchess
Gwendolen Guinness, Countess of Iveagh (1881–1966), Conservative politician in the United Kingdom
Gwendolen "Len" Howard (1894–1973), British naturalist and musician
Joyce Gwendolen Quin (born 1944), Labour Party politician in the United Kingdom
Gwendolen Mary "Gwen" Raverat (1885–1957), English wood engraver
F. Gwendolen Rees (1906–1994), British zoologist and parasitologist
Ella Gwendolen Rees Williams (1890–1979), novelist from Dominica
Guendalina Sastri (born 1953), Italian actress and singer
Gwendoline Christie (born 1978), English actress and model

Fictional characters
Gwendolen, mythical queen of the Britons
Guendoloena (Gwendolen), Merlin's wife in the Life of Merlin
Guendolen, the fairy mistress of King Arthur and mother of Gyneth in Sir Walter Scott's work The Bridal of Triermain (1813)
Gwendolen, loathly lady in Reginald Heber's Fragments of The Masque of Gwendolen (written 1816, published 1830)
Gwendolen Harleth, heroine in Daniel Deronda (1876), the last novel George Eliot completed
Gwendolen Fairfax, a major character in Oscar Wilde's comedy The Importance of Being Earnest (1895)
Gwendolen, a tragic, snobbish novelist in Henry James's 1896 short story The Figure in the Carpet
Gwendolen, the mistress of Thomas Becket and Prince Henry II in Jean Anouilh's play Becket (1959)
Gwendolen Chant, antagonist in Diana Wynne Jones' fantasy novel Charmed Life (1977)
Gwendolyn Tennyson, supporting protagonist in the Cartoon Network animated show, Ben 10
Gwendolen, a dragon in The Last Dragon Chronicles
Gwendolyn, a hero character from Bloons TD 6

Other
SS Gwendolen, a British steamship launched in 1899 and named for Lady Gwendolen Cecil, daughter of Lord Salisbury
10870 Gwendolen, a main-belt asteroid named for the discoverer's mother, educator Mary Gwendolen Ellery Read Aikman (1903–1994)
Gwendolen, a 1989 novel by Buchi Emecheta

See also
Gwen (given name)
Gwendoline (disambiguation)
Gwendolyn

References
Footnotes

Citations

Welsh feminine given names
English feminine given names